Pavillón Multiusos Fontes do Sar is a multi-purpose sports arena in Santiago de Compostela, Galicia, Spain.

It is owned and operated by Santiago de Compostela city council. The arena serves as the home of the futsal team Santiago Futsal as well as that of the basketball team Obradoiro CAB.

League attendances
This is a list of league games attendances of Obradoiro CAB at Fontes do Sar.

External links
 Official website
 Fontes do Sar at Google Maps

Indoor arenas in Spain
Basketball venues in Spain
Buildings and structures in Santiago de Compostela
Sports venues in Galicia (Spain)